Amblyptilia kosteri is a moth of the family Pterophoridae that is known from Argentina and Brazil.

Adults are on wing in June and November.

References

External links

Amblyptilia
Moths described in 2006
Pterophoridae of South America
Insects of South America
Moths of South America